The Wonderful Ice Cream Suit is a 1998 American fantasy comedy film directed by Stuart Gordon, written by Ray Bradbury and starring Edward James Olmos, Joe Mantegna, Esai Morales, Clifton Collins Jr. (credited as Clifton Gonzalez Gonzalez), Sid Caesar, Howard Morris and Gregory Sierra. It is set in East Los Angeles.

Despite some well-known actors and the writing credit of Bradbury, the film was released direct-to-video by Touchstone Home Video.

Plot
Jose Martinez is a poor young man living in East Los Angeles who is in love with the girl next door. He encounters a strange man eyeing him and runs away and throwing his wallet with his last $20 to escape. When cornered in the alley he is given back his money where the man measures his body frame. This man is Gómez who introduces himself and then whisks Martinez off to a run-down bar. There he meets two other similarly sized Latinos, Dominguez, a wandering guitar player, and Villanazul, a burgeoning philosopher and speaker for the people.

Barely letting the dust settle, Gómez shows them that they all have the same measurements, height, and weight. It is at that moment that Gómez shares his vision. The most beautiful, exquisite, vanilla-ice-cream-white summer suit is for sale at the downtown suit emporium. It is one of a kind and costs only $100. Alone, none of them have enough to purchase the suit, but by combining their money, they may be able to own the one-of-a-kind suit together. Each of the four has only $20, leaving them with $80 – just $20 short. They need one more person to complete their dream. In their haste, they choose to go along with an unwashed bum outside, Vámonos, who has the last $20 they need.

Once they buy the suit, they work out a system to decide who will wear it. Each partner will get to wear it for the entire night, one night a week. However, on the first night, they will each wear it for one hour, then return to the bar. Dominguez goes first, and stirs up a parade with his guitar playing, inspiring those who hear it to ¡Muévete! Villanazul is second, and during his hour he interrupts a politician on a soapbox to perform a poem he has written. Martinez, third in line, returns to the balcony where he first saw the girl next door. While she had previously not noticed him (because she did not have her glasses on), this time the bright white suit attracts her attention and Martinez gets her name: Celia Obregon.

Gómez is next. Acting on an earlier hunch that Gómez's plan was a scam to get the money from the others to buy the suit and then leave town, Villanazul reminds Gómez to "go with God." This was indeed the plan all along, but on the way to the bus station, Gómez encounters a mural of five men, each resembling a member of their group. Gómez decides not to leave, and returns.

Finally, it is Vámonos's turn. Gómez is infuriated that the filthy Vámonos did not get clean before it was his turn. Along with the others, they force Vámonos to take a bath, something he hadn't done in years. Once clean, Gómez lays down a series of rules, aimed at keeping the suit clean: no eating juicy tacos, drinking wine, smoking cigars, even standing under trees with birds. Furthermore, he insists that Vámonos avoid meeting with a woman named Ruby Escadrío, whose boyfriend, Toro, would ruin the suit in a fight. Vámonos heads off to a club. He is followed by the other four members, who watch him ignore every one of Gómez's rules.

Ruby Escadrío shows up, and she and Vámonos dance. Toro, predictably, is angry. The others protect Vámonos from Toro, Gómez even going so far as to insist Toro hit him instead of Vámonos. The fight ends after Toro hits Vámonos with his car. His leg is broken, but Vámonos insists that they quickly take off the suit before the ambulance arrives, because the paramedics would cut the suit off and ruin it. They do, and Vámonos is rushed to the hospital.

In the final scene, Dominguez has ironed the suit and placed it on a mannequin. As the scene continues, it becomes apparent that the suit is one of the few things the group has left: they are sleeping on a rooftop, with only a few hammocks between them. Vámonos is fine, though his leg is still in a cast. Martinez contemplates that if they were rich, they would never have had the great time they have spent together, before Villanazul tells him to get some sleep.

Cast

Background and release
The story's life and inspiration comes from Ray Bradbury's 1958 Saturday Evening Post short story "The Magic White Suit". The story was later renamed "The Wonderful Ice Cream Suit" and was adapted into a short play published in The Wonderful Ice Cream Suit and Other Plays, a 1972 collection of three plays by Ray Bradbury: The Wonderful Ice Cream Suit, The Veldt, and To the Chicago Abyss. All are adaptations from short stories of the same names.

The story has gone on to see numerous incarnations as a television drama, a stage musical, and play.  The first screen adaptation of The Wonderful Ice Cream Suit was a television version broadcast. A Los Angeles production of the play featured the debut of actor F. Murray Abraham.

The 1998 version of the film was originally shown at that year's Sundance Film Festival. Ray Bradbury wrote the screenplay. He has called that film version "the best film I've ever made." The film was director Stuart Gordon's first departure from science fiction and horror genres. He had previously directed a stage adaptation of "The Wonderful Ice Cream Suit".

Awards
Nomination:
 Annie Awards – 1998; Nominated for "Outstanding Achievement in an Animated Interstitial, Promotional Production or Title Sequence"
 Fantasporto – 1998; Nominated for "International Fantasy Film Award for Best Film"

Winner:
 Fantafestival – 1998; Won for "Best Direction" Stuart Gordon

References

External links
 
 

1998 films
1998 direct-to-video films
Films about wish fulfillment
1998 comedy films
Buena Vista Home Entertainment direct-to-video films
Films about Mexican Americans
Touchstone Pictures films
American films based on plays
Films set in Los Angeles
Films with screenplays by Ray Bradbury
Films directed by Stuart Gordon
1990s English-language films
Films produced by Roy E. Disney